Educating Rita is a 1983 British comedy-drama film directed by Lewis Gilbert with a screenplay by Willy Russell based on his 1980 stage play. The film stars Michael Caine, Julie Walters, Michael Williams and Maureen Lipman. It won multiple major awards for best actor and best actress and was nominated for three Academy Awards.

Caine and Walters both won BAFTA and Golden Globe awards for best actor and actress. The British Film Institute ranked Educating Rita the 84th greatest British film of the 20th century.

Plot
Susan (who initially calls herself Rita), a 26-year-old working-class hairdresser, is dissatisfied with the routine of her work and social life; she is reluctant to have a child, fearing it will permanently tie her to the same monotonous routine for life, and she yearns to escape to something more profound, without exactly knowing what that is. She seeks to better herself by signing up for and attending an Open University course in English Literature.

Susan's assigned Open University professor, Frank Bryant, is jaded and has long ago openly taken to the bottle, describing his teaching ability as "appalling but good enough for his appalling students". Bryant's passion for literature is reignited by Rita, whose technical ability for the subject is limited by her lack of education but whose enthusiasm Frank finds refreshing. Frank initially has misgivings about Rita's ability to adapt to student culture, but is impressed by her verve and earnestness and is forced to re-examine his attitudes and position in life; Susan finds Frank's tutelage opens doors to a bohemian lifestyle and a new self-confidence.

Frank's bitterness and cynicism return as he notices Susan beginning to adopt the pretensions of the university culture he despises. Susan becomes disillusioned by a friend's attempted suicide and realises that her new social niche is rife with the same dishonesty and superficiality she had previously sought to escape. The film ends as Frank, sent to Australia on a sabbatical, welcomes the possibilities of the change.

Cast

 Michael Caine as Dr. Frank Bryant
 Julie Walters as Susan "Rita" White
 Michael Williams as Brian
 Dearbhla Molloy as Elaine
 Jeananne Crowley as Julia, Frank's girlfriend
 Malcolm Douglas as Denny White, Rita's husband
 Godfrey Quigley as Rita's father
 Patricia Jeffares as Rita's mother
 Maeve Germaine as Sandra, Rita's sister
 Maureen Lipman as Trish, Rita's roommate
 Gerry Sullivan as Security Officer
 Pat Daly as Bursar
 Kim Fortune as Collins
 Philip Hurdwood as Tiger
 Hilary Reynolds as Lesley
 Jack Walsh as Price
 Christopher Casson as Professor
 Gabrielle Reidy as Barbara
 Des Nealon as Invigilator
 Marie Conmee as Customer in Hairdressers
 Oliver Maguire as Tutor
 Derry Power as Photographer
 Alan Stanford as Bistro Manager

Production
Lewis Gilbert says it was difficult to raise finance for the film. "Columbia wanted me to cast Dolly Parton as Rita". Julie Walters, in her feature film debut, reprised her role from the stage production.

The film is set in an unnamed English university and port city: most of the working-class characters have Scouse accents. However, it was shot entirely in and around Dublin, where minor adjustments were made to suggest the city is in the UK: in several street scenes, for example, British red telephone boxes appear. Trinity College, Dublin, is used as the setting for the university, and University College, Dublin, in Belfield, is used for Rita's summer school. The rooms used by Bryant as his office and tutorial room were those of the College Historical Society and the University Philosophical Society, respectively; and while the building was considerably refurnished, the production chose to leave portraits of Douglas Hyde and Isaac Butt and committee photographs in the former, and a bust of John Pentland Mahaffy in the latter. No. 8 Hogan Avenue in Dublin 2, near Grand Canal Dock, was used for Rita's house in the film, and one in Burlington Road, Ballsbridge, for Bryant's. The scene where Rita runs into her ex Denny and his new wife was filmed in the South Lotts area of Ringsend. The scene in France was filmed in Maynooth, County Kildare, and Pearse Station and Dublin Airport were used. The pub scene was shot in The Stag's Head on Dame Court in Dublin. However, the pub which Rita enters is the Dame Tavern which is opposite The Stag's Head. Filming also took place in Stoneybatter, with Aughrim Street Church being used for the wedding scene. Stanhope Street School was used as a production base.

Reception

Critical response

Variety magazine in December 1982 lauded Walters' interpretation of Rita as "[w]itty, down-to-earth, kind and loaded with common sense". "Rita," the review continues, "is the antithesis of the humorless, stuffy and stagnated academic world she so longs to infiltrate. Julie Walters injects her with just the right mix of comedy and pathos."

Ian Nathan reviewing the film for Britain's Empire magazine calls the film a "gem," and gives it four out of five stars. He describes Walters's "splendidly rich interpretation" of Rita and characterises her "reactions to the traditions of English lit[erature] [as] carry[ing] the caustic brilliance of true intelligence, a shattering of blithe pretension".  Of Walters and Caine, Nathan opines, "they make a beautifully odd couple, in a love story at one remove". This reviewer depicts the director's effort as "effective, and finally optimistic," and observes about the film that the playwright's "angry message that people are trapped by their environment not their abilities, is salved by the sweetness of [Frank's and Rita's] final parting."  Nathan's "verdict" of the film is one of "[c]harming, glittering characterisations that, though they don't run deep, nevertheless refresh."

Janet Maslin of The New York Times called the film "an awkward blend of intellectual pretension and cute obvious humour" and "the perfect play about literature for anyone who wouldn't dream of actually reading books"; she wrote that "the essentially two-character play has been opened up to the point that it includes a variety of settings and subordinate figures, but it never approaches anything lifelike".

Film critic Roger Ebert of the Chicago Sun-Times gave the film two stars out of four, calling the film a "forced march through a formula relationship"; he said Russell's screen adaptation "added mistresses, colleagues, husbands, in-laws, students and a faculty committee, [that were] all unnecessary" and said the playwright/screenwriter "start[ed] with an idealistic, challenging idea, and then cynically tr[ied] to broaden its appeal".

Educating Rita holds an 82% rating on Rotten Tomatoes based on seventeen reviews.

Accolades

Retrospective assessments
In 1999, the film was among the BFI Top 100 British films.

In 2007, while promoting the remake of Sleuth, Caine called Educating Rita "the last good picture [he] made before [he] mentally retired."

Home media

The film was released on DVD in the UK and the US. ITV Studios released the film onto Blu-Ray in the UK (Region B) in 2008 as a 25th Anniversary edition, to mark twenty-five years since the film's release. This edition was discontinued, but in May 2018, ITV Studios released the film onto Blu-ray again.

Proposed remake
In November 2002, the then-82-year-old director Lewis Gilbert went public with plans to remake his film "with a black cast that could include Halle Berry and Denzel Washington", with principal photography to commence in 2003. The project did not come to pass, and Gilbert's final film was Before You Go (2003).

See also 
 Rubyfruit Jungle, a novel by Rita Mae Brown, studied with great enthusiasm by Rita
 BFI Top 100 British films

References

External links
 Educating Rita at BFI Screenonline
 
 
 
 
 Educating Rita at Shot at Trinity (database of films shot at Trinity College Dublin)

1983 films
1983 comedy-drama films
British comedy-drama films
British films based on plays
Women's rights
Films directed by Lewis Gilbert
Films featuring a Best Musical or Comedy Actor Golden Globe winning performance
Films featuring a Best Musical or Comedy Actress Golden Globe winning performance
Films about educators
Films shot in the Republic of Ireland
Films set in Liverpool
Films set in universities and colleges
Open University
Best Film BAFTA Award winners
Films about the education system in the United Kingdom
1980s English-language films
1980s British films